Peavy Pond is a 2,400 acre reservoir in Iron County, Michigan. The reservoir was created by the Peavy Falls Dam. Peavy Pond is part of the Menominee Drainage Basin. It flows from dam, through the Michigamme River and the Menominee River into Lake Michigan.

See also
List of lakes in Michigan

References

Lakes of Michigan
Bodies of water of Iron County, Michigan